European law on illicit drug precursors:
Regulation (EC) No 273/2004 of the European Parliament and of the Council of 11 February 2004 on drug precursors (contains list of substances)
Council Regulation (EC) No 111/2005 of 22 December 2004 laying down rules for the monitoring of trade between the Union and third countries in drug precursors. Consolidated text (2021) (contains the same list of substances)
Commission Regulation (EC) No 297/2009 of 8 April 2009 amending Regulation (EC) No 1277/2005 laying down implementing rules for Regulation (EC) No 273/2004 of the European Parliament and of the Council on drug precursors and for Council Regulation (EC) No 111/2005 laying down rules for the monitoring of trade between the Community and third countries in drug precursors

The list of 23 substances is identical to list of UN-controlled drug precursors, except for the different categorization and inclusion of stereoisomers in EU Category 1.

List of substances

Category 1 Precursors 
phenylacetone
methyl 2-phenylacetoacetate (MAPA)
methyl 2-methyl-3-phenyloxirane-2-carboxylate (BMK methyl glycidate)
2-methyl-3-phenyloxirane-2-carboxylic acid (BMK glycidic acid)
N-acetylanthranilic acid
alpha-phenylacetoacetamide (APAA)
alpha-phenylacetoacetonitrile (APAAN)
isosafrole (cis + trans)
3,4-methylenedioxyphenylpropan-2-one
piperonal
safrole
methyl 3-(1,3-benzodioxol-5-yl)-2-methyloxirane-2-carboxylate (PMK methyl glycidate)
3-(1,3-benzodioxol-5-yl)-2-methyloxirane-2-carboxylic acid (PMK glycidic acid)
4-anilino-N-phenethylpiperidine (ANPP)
N-phenethyl-4-piperidone (NPP)
ephedrine
chloroephedrine
pseudoephedrine
chloropseudoephedrine
norephedrine
ergometrine
ergotamine
lysergic acid

The stereoisomeric forms of the substances listed in this Category not being cathine, whenever the existence of such
forms is possible.

The salts of the substances listed in this Category whenever the existence of such salts is possible and not being the salts
of cathine.

Category 2 Precursors 
red phosphorus
acetic anhydride
phenylacetic acid
anthranilic acid
piperidine
potassium permanganate

The salts of the substances listed in this Category whenever the existence of such salts is possible.

Category 3 Precursors 
hydrochloric acid (hydrogen chloride)
sulphuric acid
toluene
diethyl ether
acetone
methylethylketone

The salts of the substances listed in this Category whenever the existence of such salts is possible and not being the salts
of hydrochloric acid and sulphuric acid.

Category 4 Precursors 

Medicinal products and veterinary medicinal products containing ephedrine or its salts
Medicinal products and veterinary medicinal products containing pseudo-ephedrine or its salts

See also 
List of UN-controlled drug precursors
List of US-controlled drug precursors
Drug precursors
European Council decisions on designer drugs
European Monitoring Centre for Drugs and Drug Addiction

References 
European Monitoring Centre for Drugs and Drug Addiction | Legal topic overviews: Classification of controlled drugs – The EU system

Illegal drug trade in Europe
Science and law
European Union law